Appingedam (abbreviation: Apg) is a railway station in the city of Appingedam, Netherlands. The station was opened on 15 June 1884 and is located on the Groningen–Delfzijl railway. Nowadays the station is unstaffed. Only basic platform facilities, as a shelter and a ticket machine, remain. The station is owned by ProRail and operated by Arriva.

History 

The station building was completed in 1883. Train services started when the Groningen–Delfzijl railway was opened on 15 June 1884.

Former building 
The original station building was intended for heritage status, but was demolished after a fire in 1978.

Services

Trains 
The following train services operated by Arriva currently call at Appingedam:
2x per hour local service (stoptrein) Groningen – Delfzijl

Buses 
At the station, there are two bus connections operated by Qbuzz with the following destinations:
 45: Delfzijl – Appingedam – Holwierde – Beirum – Spijk – Losdorp – Godlinze – 't Zandt – Zeerijp – Loppersum (1x per hour)
 91: Appingedam – Holwierde – Krewerd – Oosterwijtwerd – Leermens – Eenum – Loppersum (5x per day)
 140: Delfzijl – Appingedam – Ten Boer – Groningen (1x per hour)

References

External links 
 
 Appingedam station, station information

Transport in Eemsdelta
Railway stations in Groningen (province)
Railway stations opened in 1884